The Ministry of Economy and Finance is the Kyrgyz government ministry which oversees the public finances of Kyrgyzstan. It was formed from a merge of the Ministry of Economy and Ministry of Finance after a government reshuffle on 12 February 2021.

Ministers 
Kerimzhan Kunakunov, 1991
Amangeldy Muraliyev, 1991 - 1992
Kamchybek Shakirov, December 1992 - 1994
Kemelbek Nanaev, 1994 - 1996
 Talaybek Koychumanov, 1996 - 1998
Marat Sultanov, January 1999 - July 1999
 Sultan Mederov July 1999 - 2000 - ?
 Temirbek Akmataliyev ? - 2001 - January 2002
Bolot Abildaev, January 2002 - March 2005
Akylbek Zhaparov, September 2005 - December 2007
Tazhikan Kalimbetova, December 2007 - January 2009
Marat Sultanov, January 2009 - April 2010
Temir Sariyev, April 2010 - July 2010
Chorobek Imashev, July 2010 - January 2011
Dinara Shaydieva, January 2011 - February 2011
Melis Mambetzhanov, February 2011 - December 2011
Akylbek Zhaparov, December 2011 – September 2012
, September 2012 - April 2015
Adylbek Kasymaliyev, November 2015 - December 2018
Baktygul Jeenbaeva, December 2018 - October 2020
 Kyyalbek Mukashev, October 2020 - February 2021
 Ulukbek Karmyshakov, February 2021 - October 2021
 Almaz Baketayev, October 2021 - Incumbent

See also
Government of Kyrgyzstan
Economy of Kyrgyzstan

References 

Finance
Economy of Kyrgyzstan
Kyrgyzstan
Government of Kyrgyzstan